With Love and Hisses is a silent comedy short film starring Stan Laurel and Oliver Hardy prior to their official billing as the duo Laurel and Hardy. The team appeared in a total of 107 films between 1921 and 1950

Plot
Slow-witted army private Cuthbert Hope (Laurel) manages to makes life miserable for his gruff Top Sergeant Banner (Hardy). Banner must also report back to firm Captain Bustle (Jimmy Finlayson).

Cast

See also 
 1927 in film
 Laurel and Hardy films

References

External links 

 

1927 films
1927 comedy films
American silent short films
American black-and-white films
Films directed by Fred Guiol
Laurel and Hardy (film series)
Military humor in film
Films with screenplays by H. M. Walker
1927 short films
American comedy short films
1920s American films
Silent American comedy films